Edoardo Isella D'Gómez Ventoza (born 9 October 1980), known as Edoardo Isella, is a Mexican former professional footballer who played as a defender. He is known as one of the first Afro-Mexicans to debut for CD Guadalajara.

Early life
Isella was born in Tuxtla Gutiérrez, Chiapas to a Afro-Honduran father and a Mexican mother.

International career
Isella was eligible to play for Mexico or Honduras at international level. He opted to represent the former after joining the youth academy of Mexican nationalist club Guadalajara. He managed to get an early call-up to the Mexico national football team by coach Enrique Meza after having a standout 2000–01 season with the Guadalajara first team.

See also
Afro-Mexicans

References

External links

1980 births
Living people
People from Tuxtla Gutiérrez
Footballers from Chiapas
Mexican footballers
Association football central defenders
Association football fullbacks
C.D. Guadalajara footballers
Tigres UANL footballers
Cruz Azul footballers
Chiapas F.C. footballers
Club América footballers
Premier League of Belize players
Ascenso MX players
Liga MX players
Liga Nacional de Fútbol de Guatemala players
Mexico international footballers
Mexican expatriate footballers
Mexican expatriates in Belize
Expatriate footballers in Belize
Mexican expatriate sportspeople in Guatemala
Expatriate footballers in Guatemala
Mexican people of Honduran descent